Violetta Zironi (born 5 April 1995) is an Italian singer-songwriter and actress.

In 2013, she took part in season 7 of the Italian version of The X Factor with her ukulele which soon became her signature instrument. She reached the final and finished third. She debuted with her EP Dimmi che non passa, containing her debut single "Dimmi che non passa".

In 2020, she starred in the Netflix's original film Rose Island, directed by Sydney Sibilia.

Biography

Early years
Violetta Zironi is born in Correggio, Emilia Romagna, to comic book artist and screenwriter Giuseppe Zironi, who worked for Walt Disney Italia, RAI and Mediaset, and municipal clerk Annalisa Sansone. She was first introduced to music at age of three, when she joined a local children's choir, before starting taking piano lessons.

Violetta started performing live in her early teens, singing and playing guitar, often accompanied by her father Giuseppe on harmonica and by Oscar Abelli on drums, touring in local festivals and clubs. In 2012, she met ukulele player Luca "Jontom" Tomassini, who introduced Violetta to this instrument. They performed together at the 2012 YOUkulele Festival in Rome, and Jontom wanted Violetta as a guest on his EP Likelike Highway, released by the independent label Insomnia Records.

2013–2014: The X Factor and her first EP
In 2013 Violetta showed up at the auditions for season 7 of the Italian version of The X Factor with her ukulele which soon became her signature instrument, and after impressing the judges with her version of "Shortnin' Bread" she was admitted to the live show and included in the "Under 25 Girls" team mentored by Mika. During the live shows, she performed songs such as "Let Her Go" by Passenger, "Le tasche piene di sassi" by Italian popstar Jovanotti, "Friday I'm in Love" by The Cure, "One Day / Reckoning Song" by Asaf Avidan, "Royals" by Lorde, "9 to 5" by Dolly Parton, "Skinny Love" by Birdy and "One" by U2. She finished third place and released her debut EP entitled Dimmi che non passa with Sony Music on 13 December 2013.

In 2014, Violetta was chosen to perform Dorothy Gale's songs in the Italian version of Legends of Oz: Dorothy's Return.<ref>{{cite web|url=https://it.cinema.yahoo.com/blog/multisala/il-magico-mondo-di-oz-trailer-italiano-in-esclusiva---075757508.html|title=Violetta Zironi nella Colonna Sonora di Legends of Oz: Dorothy's Return|url-status=dead|archive-url=https://web.archive.org/web/20140514212435/https://it.cinema.yahoo.com/blog/multisala/il-magico-mondo-di-oz-trailer-italiano-in-esclusiva---075757508.html|archive-date=14 May 2014}}</ref> On 21 June 2014, she released her second single "Il primo giorno d'estate", written by Luca Mattioni and Mario Cianchi, and produced by Alessandro Magnanini. During the summer, her version of "Bring Me Sunshine" was used for the TV commercial of brand Pavesini.

On 2 August 2014 she performed at the rockabilly festival "Summer Jamboree" in Senigallia, when she opened Ben E. King's show and duet with him performing "Stand By Me".

On 25 November 2014 her version of "Winter Wonderland" was included in the compilation X Factor Christmas 2014, released by Sony Music.

2015–2016: Post-X Factor and Written in Scars Tour 
In 2015 Violetta's song "Eppure mi va" was included in a shortlist of 60 tracks set to compete in the newcomers section of the Sanremo Music Festival 2015, but didn't make it to the final competition. In April, Violetta guest-starred in Jack Savoretti's Written in Scars Tour, being the opening act of almost all the Italian shows and also joining the singer on stage. She once again took part in the selections for the "Newcomers" section at the Sanremo Music Festival 2016 and again her song "Piccola ferita" was included in the shortlist, but didn't make it to the stage.

On 3 June 2016, she released her third single "Semplice", written and performed together with Italian singer-songwriter Zibba.

2017–2021: Projects in Germany 
In 2017, she moved to Berlin and signed with label Pon't Danic Music, releasing a new EP entitled Half Moon Lane on 23 February 2018.

On 14 September 2019, she released another EP entitled Scenes from My Lonely Window.

 2022: Transition to Web3 
In December 2021, at a time when she was considering leaving the music industry, Zironi learned about music NFTs and decided to pursue releasing her music on the Ethereum blockchain. She released her first collection, Handmade Songs, in January 2022 and began hosting regular Twitter spaces about music NFTs.

The success of Handmade Songs encouraged her to release a larger collection. In April 2022, she collaborated with Nifty Music to release Moonshot'', a collection of 2500 NFTs featuring five songs written by her and Michael Ochs and produced by Matt Rollings at Sound Emporium Studios in Nashville. The collection also featured artwork drawn by her father, Giuseppe Zironi, who was an illustrator at Walt Disney Studios.

Discography

Extended plays

Singles

Other charted songs

Guest appearances

Other appearances in compilation albums

Music videos

Filmography

Awards and nominations

References

External links
 
 
 

Italian country singers
X Factor (Italian TV series) contestants
Ukulele players
People from Correggio, Emilia-Romagna
1995 births
Living people
21st-century Italian singers